Armani Depaul (born Oakland, California, 1988), also known as Flav, is an American rapper, singer, songwriter, record producer, and director. Based in the Bay Area in Northern California, he operates the independent label Beach Boi Music.

He has released a number of singles, and collaborated with artists such as Stevie Joe, Iamsu!, Kool John, DJ Fresh, and Sage the Gemini. In 2012 he contributed production to the track "Try'na Get On" off the J. Stalin album Memoirs of a Curb Server. Since 2012, he's had a number of music videos on VEVO.

Early life
Armani Depaul was born in Oakland, California in 1988, and spent his childhood growing up in Richmond, California. Depaul developed an early interest in hip hop. His father was an artist and musician, and he'd join his father in the studio starting at age nine.

Music career

Early years
Depaul started producing and writing rap and hip hop in 2002, and in 2006 Big Von on 106 KMEL put Depaul's first record "Cookies 'n Milk" into rotation. He soon after released one of his first music videos for the single. Depaul performed on BET's 106 & Park for "Wild Out Wednesday" in 2008, and opened for Akon in 2009.

Starting in 2010 he began putting out a new mixtape and music video every other month, a trend he continued until 2012. While in the Bay Area he has also written and produced tracks for artists including Philthy Rich, J. Stalin, Dorrough Music, Audio Push, Clyde Carson, and Iamsu!. He operates the independent label Beach Boi Music, on which he releases most of his solo material. Since 2012 he's had a number of singles released with music videos on music channel VEVO.

Memoirs of a Curb Server

Depaul contributed production to the track "Try'na Get On" off the J. Stalin album Memoirs of a Curb Server in July 2012. The album peaked at number 54 on the R&B/Hip-Hop Albums chart and at 16 on the Heatseekers Albums chart, making it J. Stalin's most successful album to date. The album features guest appearances from E-40, Mistah F.A.B., Too Short, Yukmouth, The Jacka and Richie Rich, among others. Music videos have been filmed for the song "Try'na Get On" featuring Armani de Paul and Philthy Rich.

Recent singles
His single "Ride On It" featuring Iamsu! and Kool John came out in July 2013, with a music video also released online. Released in December 2013 on Beach Boi Music, Rapbay, and Urbanlife Distribution, his digital track "A Million Ways" was a collaboration with AM Dre. The track featured Sage the Gemini as producer, with Gemini and Smoovie and Salty also featured. As of 2014 he continues to release singles online, such as "Steph Curry" in January.

He has a project with Dj.Fresh titled The Morning Show, due out in June 2014, and his independent release HashTag Flav is due out in the summer as well.

Discography

Singles

Production credits
2012: "Tryna Get On" by J. Stalin off Memoirs of a Curb Server (Livewire, INgrooves)

Appearances

Music videos

See also
West Coast hip hop

Further reading
Video: Armani Depaul on Just Aint Heard of Me Yet! Episode 2 (August 2011)

References

External links

Armani Depaul on Facebook
Armani Depaul on Twitter
Media
ArmaniDepaulVEVO
Armani Depaul on YouTube
Armani Depaul on SoundCloud

Living people
Rappers from the San Francisco Bay Area
1988 births
Musicians from Oakland, California
Record producers from California
Musicians from Richmond, California
21st-century American rappers